Puka Urqu (Quechua puka red, urqu mountain, "red mountain", also spelled Puca Orkho) is a  mountain in the Bolivian Andes. It is located in the Potosí Department, Charcas Province, San Pedro de Buena Vista Municipality. The Ch'alla Mayu flows along its southern slope.

References 

Mountains of Potosí Department